Robert Blatt (November 3, 1921 – July 5, 1994) was an American alpine skier. Blatt, who attended Stanford University, won the Bradley Plate as the best all-around collegiate male skier at the 1940/1941 Sun Valley Intercollegiate meet, a four-day event beginning on December 29, 1940. He competed in Alpine skiing at the 1948 Winter Olympics, finishing 29th in men's combined and 44th in men's downhill.

References

External links
 

1921 births
1994 deaths
American male alpine skiers
Olympic alpine skiers of the United States
Alpine skiers at the 1948 Winter Olympics
Sportspeople from Norfolk, Virginia
Stanford University alumni